Calodesma collaris is a moth of the family Erebidae. It was described by Dru Drury in 1782. It is found in Brazil, Paraguay, Argentina and Bolivia.

References

Calodesma
Moths described in 1782